is a Japanese mecha anime television series. Produced by Tori Pro, Toei Animation (not credited), and Studio Nue (also not credited). It consisted of 26 episodes from July 27, 1978 to February 15, 1979 and Broadcast from TV Asahi.

Plot Summary 
Space Genie Daikengo flies through space to re-establish galactic peace; on-board prince Ryger, who ran away from his planet Emperius to defeat the menace out of his reign borders, in order to save his people; Cleo, corrupted prime minister's daughter, help him along with two nice little robots, Anike and Otoke. They fight evil Lady Baracross, leading invasion forces, with her assistant Roboleon, wearing a Napoleon style hat. Daikengo is the first robot with scuttles on his mouth. When he opens them, his vampyre style teeth are shown and he can spit fire.

Overview 
The first and last work produced by "Tori Pro" which was launched by Jinzo Toriumi, who left Tatsunoko Productions. It was planned and produced by Satoshi Suyama and Akiyoshi Sakai who left the company at the same time. It is a robot anime that depicts the story of the main characters who are active in. The universe. Mitsuko Horie, a singer who has sung many anime songs, was the first voice actor in the anime, and Satoshi Shimada, who had already debuted as a Dubbed Voice Actor in Western movies, was also the first voice over in the anime.

Sometimes it is said that "The stage is set on a star other than Earth" (however, there are multiple episodes set on the earth), and he fashion of the characters is based on the Western European style of the Middle Ages, but mixed gender design. (Prince Liger's costume has a hem that extends app the way down like a woman's skirt), and it a different ethnic feel from earth. There are also settings that have not been seen in robot Animation so far, such as the "belt sword" taken out from the buckle of the belt and the original stone statue of Daikengo itself

Because it was a local series frame at key stations, Asahi Broadcasting Corporation in the weekday early morning ("current is Good Morning Asahi while broadcast") frame, Kyushu Asahi Broadcasting on Friday at 5:00 pm preceding broadcast in 30 frame is performed the broadcast time zone of this work was different for each region. In addition to those broadcast, there were areas where Tv Asahi-affiliated full network station are located but broadcast by stations outside the affiliate. At the key stations, after returning to the re-broadcast frame after the end, the local news programs "satellite at 6o'clock" will start on April 2, 1979, one and a half months later.

With the hit of this work Takatoku Toys commercializes the same bird professional original "Ryoutora Giant Gokaiser"

On September 22, 2008 to December 15, 2008, Toei Channel re-broadcast the New Master verizon in the "exciting!! anime time" frame has been carried out

Characters 
 Liger (17 years old): Hiroya Ishimaru (also serves as the next notice narration)
hero. The second prince of Emperius. A master of swords and a hot-blooded man. Combat ship pilot.
At first, he was literally a "rogue," but he grew up personally throughout his journey.

 Cleo (16 years old): Mitsuko Horie
Dulles' daughter. A beautiful woman who excels in martial arts, has a strong spirit, and is a manly man. Daiken buggy pilot.

 Anike: Toku Nishio
The older brother of a support robot who serves Liger. Daiken Caterpillar Pilot.

 Otoke: Inoue Yo
The younger brother of a support robot who serves Liger. He is taller than his brother. Like his brother, he is a Daiken Caterpillar pilot.

 King Empel (50 years old): Yuzuru Fujimoto
Father of ligers. King of Emperius, the main star of the Galactic Federation. Always calm and deposited.

By issuing Liger's "arrest" order, which broke the order in the first half of the story (although it was distorted by Dulse into an "assassination" order), "father's position" and "federation's position" I was worried about it.

 Queen Eliza (42 years old): Kyoko Tarui
Liger's mother. A gentle and peace-loving woman.

 Zamson (20 years old): Shunji Yamada
Liger and Euger's older brother. It was thought that he was killed in action, but he revived as a cyborg .

 Bryman: Goro Naya (also serves as narration)
A mysterious cyborg warrior who drives a horse-shaped mecha sala bradder and helps a liger.

 Yuger (15 years old): Satoshi Shimada
Liger's younger brother. 15 years old. A gentle and honest boy who is the exact opposite of his brother. However, the sense of justice is comparable to his brother.
Initially, he was supposed to become a Daikengo pilot at the behest of his father. In the final episode, he commanded the Galactic Federation Army and made a breakthrough to Magellan, which was protected by a space storm.

 Dulles (45 years old): Jun Hazumi
Cleo's father. Emperius's military minister, but he is a member of the Magellan army. In episode 12, Yuger sees him communicating with Roboleon, which causes a coup d'etat and makes Daikengo a souvenir, but Roboleon is about to purge him as a souvenir.
However, he was saved by the ligers who were secretly riding Daikengo, and even though he was forgiven, he rescued the liger from the sudden hit by Roboleon who withdrew, and ended up as a warrior.

 Emperor Magellan: Takashi Tanaka
Ruler of Magellan. It seems to have tremendous power.

 Baracross (? Years old): Keiko Tomochika
General Commander of the Star Magellan. An angry and cruel woman. He is also a user of space ninjutsu.

Roboleon: Takeshi Aono
A robot general made in rose cloth. A ruthless but comical side that mercilessly purges those who have surrendered. In front of the rose cross, it is mellow and the habit is "dizziness ...". The first person is "Robo".

 Goricki: Shigezō Sasaoka
A big man who is a servant of Dulse and has a strong strength. He followed him during the Dulse coup, but in the end he fought against Robo Leon to protect Dulse, who was betrayed by Robo Leon, but he was defeated.

 Dr. Gooder': Takashi Tanaka
Magellan Army Scientist. Remodeling the dying Prince Zamson into a Bryman and secretly continuing to support him.

Mechanism

Daikengo 
The legendary guardian deity that has been passed down to the Emperius star for generations. Resurrected by receiving the energy of the genie star.

The giant fighter Combat Ship (one crew member), the buggy-type giant machine Daiken Buggy (one crew member), and the giant tank Daiken Caterpillar (two crew members) combine to form the giant robot Daiken Go. Normally, it transforms into a mobile base / Daiken base and runs around the universe. Use the call "Kengo Separator" to separate into each machine, "Daiken Base Arranger" to combine into the base form, and "Space Genie Daikengo" to combine into the Genie form.

The total length is 120.0m and the weight is 800t. The power source is photon energy. A single warp is also possible.

When the armor of the face splits in two, it has a mouth with fangs like Hannya, and it spits fire from there (Daiken Fire).

Weapons 
• Daiken Fire
Flamethrower emitted from the mouth. From there, take a pattern that leads to a special move. Similar flame radiation is possible from the upper part of the booster on the back.

• xDAIKEN Space Torpedo
A shark- shaped torpedo fired from a triangular launch port that appears with both belly bellies stored. After the second episode, it becomes an ordinary missile and is sometimes called a Daiken missile.

• Daiken Chak
Wing end Pitot tubular part The left and right pair are electromagnetically coupled to form a nunchaku- shaped weapon.

• Daiken Cutter
It pops out from the tip of the toe and cuts through the enemy's beast bone mecha.

• Arrow Fencer
A slender sword that is stored in the legs and taken out from the kneecap. Equipped with two, it basically fights with two swords. His special moves are the " Rotating Large Sword " that connects at the rear end of the handle and rotates it to chop it, and the " Special Cross Sword " that cuts the opponent into crosses using the dual wield style . The cross sword is used overwhelmingly more frequently. When taking it out, take a unique stance of crossing the two on the head.

• Daiken Shield
Defensive armament. Remove the pentagonal shoulder shield and connect it at the rear end to use it as a handheld hexagonal shield. It may be thrown and attacked like Frisbee (Daiken Guard Run).

• Daiken Punch
A so-called "rocket punch" that shoots from the elbow.

Beast Bone mecha 
The main weapon of the Magellan Empire. As the name implies, it is a robot that imitates the bones of a beast . Prior to the advent of Daikengo, beast bone mecha was a threat to the Galactic Federation.

The animal bone mecha basically uses vertebrates such as dinosaurs as motifs, but there are also those with arthropods such as Kotsupider and Ganilla as motifs. In addition, there are mass-produced aircraft, and many fighters in the shape of fish bones have appeared.

Part of the magazine [ main literature specific detailed information ] in the " bone beast mechanism is listed as" but, properly " Shishikotsu mechanism is."

Others 
Sarah Blader
A horse-shaped machine on which Bryman is boarding. Mainly armed with two laser cannons on the forefoot.
Empel command
A large battle mother ship owned by Emperius. There are countless fighters on board. With the exception of Daikengo, it can be said that it is the largest force currently owned by the Galactic Federation

Staff
 Planning: Jinzo Toriumi
 Original: Akiyoshi Sakai (serialized magazines- " TV Land ", " Televi-kun ")
 Art Director: Mitsuki Nakamura
 Sound Director: Yasunori Honda
 Music: Hiroshi Tsutsui
 Sound Effects: Ishida Sound Pro
 Mechanic Settings : Kunio Okawara
 Character Settings  : Motosuke Takahashi , Chuichi Iguchi, Shuaki Takemoto
 General Director: Akira Yahiro
 Producers: Yoshiaki Koizumi (TV Asahi), Satoshi Suyama (Tori Pro), Mitsuo Sato (Green Box)
 Animation Director: Yoshinori Tanabe
 Background: Kazuo Okada
 Color Design: Kunitoshi Okajima
 Special Effects: Masanori Yamazaki
 Photography: Hideo Okazaki and others
 Edited by: Eiko Nishide
 Recording: Atsushi Harada
 Developing: Toei Chemical Industry
 Producers: Masatoshi Yui, Takashi Arai
 Production Progress: Hiroshi Takahashi, Koji Yasuda, Sachiko Watanabe, etc.
 Production Cooperation: Green Box
 Produced by: TV Asahi, Tori Pro, Toei Agency

Episodes 
In all times, the letter "star" is used in the subtitle.

Product Development 
Z Build Plan Daikengo, which is a set of combat ship, Daiken buggy, and Daiken caterpillar, is sold separately from Takatoku in the Z alloy series. In addition, "Daikengo Combat Action" that can be transformed into a Daiken base and a standard alloy of Daikengo and Sarabredder have been released.

At the time of broadcasting, Takatoku's Z Build Plan Daikengo advertisement published in the Asahi Shimbun was a catch phrase of Amazing Build Plan, and while the three machines before transformation can be played alone, Daiken can be connected vertically. It appeals to Go that it can be combined with the Daiken base by connecting it horizontally.

External links 

Toei Animation television
1978 anime television series debuts
TV Asahi original programming
1979 Japanese television series endings
Super robot anime and manga